Caesar Petrovich Korolenko (3 October 1933 – 14 July 2020) was a Russian psychiatrist. His scientific work was  mainly on addictive disorders.

He died from COVID-19 during the COVID-19 pandemic in Russia.

Membership in scientific societies 
 The New York Academy of Sciences, a full member
 Anthropology & Medicine, a member of the editorial board
During the period of 1964–2006 Caesar Korolenko held the chair of psychiatry in the Novosibirsk Medical Institute.

Awards 
Professor Korolenko held the title of Honoured Scientist of the Russian Federation (ru).

Publications in English 
Books

 Papers

References

External links

1933 births
2020 deaths
People from Brest, Belarus
People from Polesie Voivodeship
Russian psychiatrists
Honoured Scientists of the Russian Federation
Academic journal editors
Deaths from the COVID-19 pandemic in Russia
Novosibirsk State Medical University alumni